Have a Good Funeral, My Friend... Sartana Will Pay is a 1970  Spaghetti Western film directed by Giuliano Carnimeo, written by Roberto Gianviti and starring Gianni Garko as Sartana.

Plot 
 
After witnessing the massacre of Joe Benson and his band of prospectors (and wiping out the killers), Sartana is ready to do some investigating as to why. However, since almost everyone in the town of Indian Creek is eager to buy up the dead man's land, there's a long list of suspects, including the town banker, a female saloon owner and the owner of the local gambling house. Even the local sheriff and the dead prospector's niece who now owns the land can't be ruled out, and the closer Sartana gets to the truth the more attempts are made on his life and the more funerals he'll willingly pay for...as long as HE is the one doing the killing.

Cast 
 Gianni Garko as Sartana
 Daniela Giordano as Abigail Benson
 Ivano Staccioli as Blackie
 Helga Liné as Saloon Girl Mary
 Luis Induni as The Sheriff
 Franco Ressel as Samuel Piggott
 George Wang as Lee Tse Tung 
 Franco Pesce as The Gravedigger 
 Rick Boyd as  Jim Piggott   
 Attilio Dottesio as Joe Benson

Release
Have a Good Funeral, My Friend...Sartana Will Pay was released in October 1970.

References

External links 

Have a Good Funeral, My Friend... Sartana Will Pay at Variety Distribution

1970 films
1970s Italian-language films
1970 Western (genre) films
Spaghetti Western films
Films directed by Giuliano Carnimeo
Films shot in Almería
Films scored by Bruno Nicolai
1970s Italian films